Frank Stanley Nugent (May 27, 1908 – December 29, 1965) was an American screenwriter, journalist, and film reviewer, who wrote 21 film scripts, 11 for director John Ford. He wrote almost a thousand reviews for The New York Times before leaving journalism for Hollywood. He was nominated for an Academy Award in 1953 and twice won the Writers Guild of America Award for Best Written American Comedy. The Writers Guild of America, West ranks his screenplay for The Searchers (1956) among the top 101 screenplays of all time.

Early life and film criticism
Nugent was born in New York City on May 27, 1908, the son of Frank H. and Rebecca Roggenburg Nugent. He graduated from Regis High School in 1925 and studied journalism at Columbia University, graduating in 1929, where he worked on the student newspaper, the Columbia Spectator. He started his journalism career as a news reporter with The New York Times in 1929 and in 1934 moved to reviewing films for that newspaper. At the end of 1936 Nugent succeeded Andre Sennwald as its motion picture editor and critic, and held the post until 1940. In that position he wrote very favorable reviews of Show Boat (1936), and of The Wizard of Oz and Gone with the Wind (1939).

One account of his output at the Times says that "He was known for his acerbic wit and poison-tipped pen, and even his news articles had verve and voice; his features were chatty, clever, and intimate, if occasionally smug." Nugent praised director John Ford without reservation, writing of Stagecoach in 1939: 

Of Ford's The Grapes of Wrath, released the following year, he wrote:

His critiques were sometimes sharp-tongued. He called Mannequin with Joan Crawford and Spencer Tracy a "glib, implausible and smart-gowned little drama, as typical Metro-Goldwyn-Mayer as Leo himself". Of The Hunchback of Notre Dame (1939), he wrote: "The film is almost unrelievedly brutal and without the saving grace of unreality which makes Frankenstein's horrors a little comic." He aimed his barbs at individuals as well, like "the screen's latest leading man, John Trent, former transport pilot. Mr. Trent is square-jawed, rangy and solidly masculine. Eventually he may deteriorate and become an actor as well."

He particularly disliked the work of Tyrone Power for 20th Century Fox, and began his review of The Story of Alexander Graham Bell (1939) by saying: "If only because it has omitted Tyrone Power, 20th Century Fox's [picture] must be considered one of that company's more sober and meritorious contributions to the historical drama." In response, Fox and the theater that presented the film reduced their advertising in The New York Times for months, costing the paper $50,000. His review of Fox's The Grapes of Wrath led to an offer from Fox studio head Darryl F. Zanuck to work as a script editor for $400 a week, a very generous salary at the time. By then he had written almost a thousand film reviews for the Times.

Career in films
Nugent continued to write for the Times on a freelance basis during his first several years in Hollywood. For Zanuck he worked on scripts, reviewing others' screenplays and providing criticism. He said later that "Zanuck told me he didn't want me to write, that he just thought the studio would save money if I criticized the pictures before they were made." Fox terminated him in 1944 and Nugent turned to work as a freelance writer. His sharp critiques served Zanuck, but won him no screenwriting work, while his criticism of his colleagues' work, just as clever as when he was a journalist, was not designed to win collaborators. He returned one script to Zanuck with a note saying: "My opinion of this script is unchanged. As far as I'm concerned, there's nothing wrong with it that a waste basket can't cure."

Nugent was working on a magazine article about The Fugitive (1947), while the film was being shot, when he met the film director John Ford on the set in Mexico. Their meeting led to Nugent's long and fruitful association with the John Ford Stock Company. Ford hired him to work on his next film, Fort Apache (1948), and Nugent wrote screenplays for several more of Ford's westerns, including 3 Godfathers (also 1948), She Wore a Yellow Ribbon (1949), Wagon Master (1950) and The Searchers. Of the 21 film scripts Nugent worked on, 11 were for Ford. They had a difficult working relationship, as did everyone who worked with Ford, but Nugent later said "it was a small price to pay for working with the best director in Hollywood." In assessing their work together, Glenn Frankel credits Nugent with providing Ford with more sophisticated male-female relationships than his other scripts and tempering the racism so endemic to the western genre's portrayal of Native Americans. Nugent's screenplay for Fort Apache, for example, altered his source material's "visceral loathing" for the Indigenous characters, transforming them into "victims of government-sanctioned criminal exploitation". In the place of like-minded Native leaders, he introduced contrast between the young, hot-blooded warrior and the wiser veteran, which became a standard feature of the Hollywood western.

His screenplay for The Searchers (1956), has been ranked among the top 101 screenplays of all time by the Writers Guild of America, West.<ref>101 screenplays  Writers Guild of America, West (WGAW)</ref> It was named the Greatest Western of all time by the American Film Institute in 2008. It placed 12th on the American Film Institute's 2007 list of the 100 Greatest American Films.

He wrote other westerns for Stuart Heisler (Tulsa), for Robert Wise (Two Flags West), for Raoul Walsh (The Tall Men), and for Phil Karlson (They Rode West and Gunman's Walk). Nugent also worked on Mister Roberts.

His screenplays in other genres include The Red Beret, North West Frontier, Trouble in the Glen, The Quiet Man, The Rising of the Moon and Donovan's Reef.

For his work on for The Quiet Man, he received a nomination for the Academy Award for Writing Adapted Screenplay. The Quiet Man won the Writers Guild of America Award for Best Written American Comedy in 1953 and he won the same award in 1956 for Mister Roberts (1955).

Of his long association with Ford, Nugent once wrote:

Nugent served as the President of the Writers Guild of America, West (WGAW) from 1957 to 1958 and as its representative on the Motion Picture Industry Council from 1954 to 1959. He also served a three-year stint (1956–59) as chairman of the building fund committee that oversaw the construction of its headquarters in Beverly Hills.

Personal life
On January 3, 1939, he married Dorothy J. Rivers. New York Mayor Fiorello LaGuardia performed the ceremony in his City Hall chambers. They divorced in 1952. He married his second wife, Jean Lavell, in 1953.

Nugent suffered from heart problems for several years before dying of a heart attack on December 29, 1965, in Los Angeles.

Feature film screenwriting credits
Credited as Frank S. Nugent or Frank Nugent for screenplay or the story that provides the basis for the screenplay.Fort Apache, 1948 3 Godfathers, 1948 Tulsa, 1949She Wore a Yellow Ribbon, 1949 Wagon Master, 1950 Two Flags West, 1950The Quiet Man, 1952 Angel Face, 1952Paratrooper, released in the UK as The Red Beret, 1953They Rode West, 1954Trouble in the Glen, 1954Mister Roberts, 1955 The Tall Men, 1955The Searchers, 1956 The Rising of the Moon, 1957 Gunman's Walk, 1958The Last Hurrah, 1958 North West Frontier,  1959Two Rode Together,  1961 Donovan's Reef, 1963 Incident at Phantom Hill, 1966

 References 

Additional sources
 Richard Corliss, Talking Pictures: Screenwriters in the American Cinema, 1927-1973 (Overlook Press, 1974)
 Arleen Keylin and Christine Bent., eds, The New York Times at the Movies (Arno Press, 1979), 
 Peter Lehman, Close Viewings: An Anthology of New Film Criticism (University Press of Florida, 1990), 
 Joseph McBride, "The Pathological Hero's Conscience: Screenwriter Frank S. Nugent Was the Quiet Man Behind John Ford", Written By, May 2001

 External links 

 Frank S. Nugent's Reviews for The New York Times Frank Nugent, Alan Le May, John Ford, The Searchers: Screenplay'' (Warner Bros, 1956) available online

1908 births
1965 deaths
Columbia University Graduate School of Journalism alumni
American male screenwriters
American film critics
Writers Guild of America Award winners
20th-century American non-fiction writers
Regis High School (New York City) alumni
20th-century American male writers
American male non-fiction writers
Screenwriters from New York (state)
20th-century American screenwriters